Cemil Turan (born 1 January 1947 in Istanbul) is a former Turkish football player and the current director of Fenerbahçe S.K. Academy.

Career 
He debuted at Sarıyer G.K. when he was 14. He transferred first to Istanbulspor and then to Fenerbahçe, where he won 3 league championship titles (1974, 1975, 1978). He was three times league topscorer with 14 goals in 1974 and with 17 goals in 1976 and 1978. He scored 194 lifetime goals. Turan scored 19 goals at his 44 games with the Turkish national football team between 1969 and 1979. He ranks 4th with this notable performance still today. After his retirement in 1980, Turan served at various administrative positions first in Istanbulspor and then in Fenerbahçe. He is currently coordinator for the sporting infrastructure of Fenerbahçe.

Match-fixing Scandal
On 3 July 2011, Turan was taken into custody because of alleged involvement in several cases of player manipulation. He was later released and all charges were dropped.

Honours
Fenerbahçe
Turkish League: 1973–74, 1974–75, 1977–78
Turkish Cup: 1973–74, 1978–79
Turkish Super Cup: 1973, 1975, 1978, 1980
TSYD Cup: 1973, 1975, 1976, 1978, 1979, 1980

Individual
Gol Kralı: 1973–74, 1975–76, 1977–78
Turkish Footballer of the Year: 1977

References

1947 births
Living people
Turkish footballers
Fenerbahçe S.K. footballers
İstanbulspor footballers
Turkey international footballers
Süper Lig players
Sarıyer S.K. footballers
Association football forwards
People from Üsküdar
Footballers from Istanbul